Stamford Bridge Greyhounds was the greyhound racing operation held at Stamford Bridge in London.

Origins
During 1933, Stamford Bridge Ltd, a subsidiary of parent company Greyhound Racing Association (GRA), took over the athletics track belonging to the London Athletic Club and forced them to leave because they wished to construct a greyhound track around the football pitch.

Opening
The first night of racing was held on 31 July 1933  The track circumference as was 434 yards and it was described as a fast, average sized course with short 80-yard straights and banked bends of wide radius. Railers showed a slight advantage and the greyhounds were supplied by the famous GRA Hook Estate and Kennels in Northaw. The hare system was an outside McKee Cable hare.

History
The Charlie Ashley trained Shove Halfpenny won the 1935 Pall Mall Stakes and Joe Harmon won the 1938 running of the same competition with Roeside Creamery.
Events at Stamford Bridge included the Chelsea Cup, won by Creamery Border in 1936, who set a then a new world record of 28.01 seconds for 500 yards. In addition to the Chelsea Cup the tracks premier event would be the Stamford Bridge Produce Stakes, which was inaugurated in 1936. 

Albert Jonas trained Return Fare II to Berkeley Cup success and the same trainer trained Roving Youth to the 1940 English Greyhound Derby final. In 1944 Stamford Bridge maintained its reputation for being an extremely fast track when Ballyhennessy Seal clocked 27.64 seconds for the 500 yards course, another world and national record. 

In 1946, the Stamford Bridge totalisator turnover surpassed £5 million, to put this in perspective to football and Chelsea F.C. at the time, the British transfer record at the same time in 1946 was £14,500.

Jonas continued to train big race winners winning the Springbok with Kids Delight in 1947. During the fifties Kenneth Obee was Racing Manager before switching to sister track Harringay replaced by F A Branscombe. Assistant Racing Managers at this time included Sidney Wood and Jeff Jeffcoate. The resident trainers in 1965 consisted of Hancox, Ivor Morse, Forster, Sid Mann, Dick Clark and Jim Singleton but the GRA forced former trainer Albert Jonas and Dick Clark to leave the Northaw kennels.  

With the formation of the Bookmakers Afternoon Greyhound Service (BAGS) in 1967 the National Greyhound Racing Society named Stamford Bridge as one of the tracks to host the service. This meant racing was changed to Thursday afternoons at 2.30pm, with just one evening meeting remaining on Saturday at 6.15pm.

Closure
On 1 August 1968, the GRA closed Stamford Bridge to greyhound racing, quoting the fact that Stamford Bridge was forced to race on the same days as the White City.

Competitions

Stamford Bridge Produce Stakes

Other
Winter Stayers Trophy
Chelsea Cup
May Stakes

Track records

Tote Returns

+closed during the year

References

Greyhound racing in the United Kingdom
Greyhound racing in London